Thrive Capital is an American venture capital firm based in New York City. It focuses on media and internet investments. The firm was founded by Joshua Kushner who is also co-founder of Oscar Health and minority owner of the Memphis Grizzlies.

Background 

Joshua Kushner is son of billionaire real estate developer Charles Kushner. His brother Jared Kushner is the son-in-law and former senior advisor to former U.S. President Donald Trump.

After graduating from Harvard College in 2008, Kushner spent a year at Goldman Sachs working in its private equity division. In 2009, he enrolled at Harvard Business School and used his earning from Goldman Sachs and money from his trust funds to invest in companies like Kickstarter and GroupMe. He caught the attention of Joel Cutler, co-founder of General Catalyst who convinced Kushner to start his own venture capital firm.

At only 24, Kushner founded Thrive Capital in 2009. Cutler and General Catalyst provided the initial $5 million in seed money for the firm in 2010 as well as introduced investors to the firm and Kusher.

In 2011, the firm raised another $40 million from Princeton University, Wellcome Trust, Peter Thiel and other investors.

In 2017, the firm underwent complications as it was connected to Donald Trump who was now serving as the U.S. President. Concerns were raised about a conflict of interest from its connection to the Trump administration. Kushner's brother, Jared who was Trump's son-in-law and senior advisor was also a general partner at the firm and had holdings in it. In that year, Jared sold his entire stake in the firm and severed his connections with it.

In May 2021, Petershill Partners had invested around $120 million in Thrive Capital for a 3% stake. It valued the firm at $3.6 billion.

In September 2021, the firm registered as an investment adviser with the U.S. Securities and Exchange Commission. The firm stated it planned to have some funds that will make investments in public companies and cryptocurrencies.

In January 2023, a group of five investors Bob Iger, Mukesh Ambani, Henry Kravis,  Xavier Niel and Jorge Paulo Lemann paid $175 million for a 3% stake of Thrive Capital.

The firm is noted for being an early investors in several high profile technology platforms such as Instagram, GitHub, Spotify and Twitch.

Notable employees of the firm include Jared Weinstein and Willem Van Lancker.

Funds

Notable investments 

 Affirm Holdings
 Artsy
 Airtable
 Cadre
 ClassPass
 Compass, Inc.
 Fanatics
 GroupMe
 GitHub
 Greenhouse Software
 Hims & Hers Health
 Instacart
 Instagram
 Kickstarter
 Lemonade, Inc.
 Mapbox
 Monzo
 Neverware
 Nubank
 Opendoor
 OpenGov
 Oscar Health
 Patreon
 Plaid
 Robinhood Markets
 Skims
 Slack Technologies
 Spree Commerce
 Spotify
 Spring
 Stripe
 Tictail
 Twitch
 Whisper
 Unity Technologies
 Warby Parker

References

External links
 

American companies established in 2009
Financial services companies based in New York City
Financial services companies established in 2009
Investment companies based in New York City
Venture capital firms of the United States